Tim Bergling (8 September 1989 – 20 April 2018), known professionally as Avicii, was a Swedish DJ, remixer and music producer. At the age of 16, Bergling began posting his remixes on electronic music forums, which led to his first record deal. He rose to prominence in 2011 with his single "Levels". His debut studio album, True (2013), blended electronic music with elements of multiple genres and received generally positive reviews. It peaked in the top 10 in more than 15 countries and topped international charts; the lead single, "Wake Me Up", topped most music markets in Europe and reached number four in the United States.

In 2015, Bergling released his second studio album, Stories, and in 2017 he released an EP, Avīci (01). His catalog also included the singles "I Could Be the One" with Nicky Romero, "You Make Me", "X You", "Hey Brother", "Addicted to You", "The Days", "The Nights", "Waiting for Love", "Without You" and "Lonely Together". Bergling was nominated for a Grammy Award for his work on "Sunshine" with David Guetta in 2012 and "Levels" in 2013. Several music publications credit Bergling as among the DJs who ushered electronic music into Top 40 radio in the early 2010s.

Bergling retired from touring in 2016, after several years of stress and poor mental health. On 20 April 2018, he committed suicide while on holiday in Muscat, Oman. In 2019, his third and final album, Tim, was released posthumously.

Life and career

1989–2010: Early life and career 
Tim Bergling was born in Stockholm on 8 September 1989, the son of Klas Bergling, who ran an office supply business, and actress Anki Lidén. He had three siblings: David Bergling, Linda Sterner, and actor Anton Körberg. He started mixing in his bedroom at the age of eight.

Inspired by his brother, who was also a DJ, he began making music at the age of 16, teaching himself to use a pirated copy of FL Studio. In May 2007, Bergling signed on with the Dejfitts Plays label. He was a member of the Laidback Luke Forums, where he refined his craft and, at times, demonstrated his distinct deep house style. By 2009 to 2010, Bergling was a prolific producer and was releasing music incredibly quickly. His remixes during this period were "Sound of Now", "Muja", "Ryu" and "Even". Bergling explained that the name Avicii means "the lowest level of Buddhist hell" and he chose the moniker because his real name was already used upon creating his Myspace page. Then, in 2010, Bergling released the hit song "Seek Bromance", which reached the top 20 in several countries, including Belgium, France, the Netherlands, United Kingdom, and Sweden. He also remixed Nadia Ali's classic single "Rapture" for her album Queen of Clubs Trilogy: Onyx Edition. In October 2010, Bergling signed with the European A&R team with EMI Music Publishing.

2011–2013: "Levels"

In 2011, Bergling's track "Fade into Darkness" was sampled by Leona Lewis on her single "Collide". The sampling was not accredited and led to controversy as Bergling attempted to block the single's release. The matter was resolved out of court, with "Collide" being made a joint release between Lewis and Bergling. In October 2011, Bergling released "Levels", which launched him into the mainstream. "Levels" reached the top ten in Austria, Belgium, Bosnia and Herzegovina, Croatia, Denmark, Finland, Germany, Greece, Ireland, Italy, the Netherlands, Slovenia and the United Kingdom, whilst topping the charts in Hungary, Norway and Sweden.

In 2012, his collaboration track "Sunshine" with David Guetta was nominated for a Grammy award under the category for Best Dance Recording. On 23 March 2012, Bergling's unsigned single "Last Dance" was previewed on Pete Tong's show on BBC Radio 1. The song was later released on 27 August 2012. At Ultra Music Festival 2012 in Miami, he premiered two tracks, "Girl Gone Wild" (Avicii's UMF Remix) with Madonna and "Superlove" with Lenny Kravitz. Bergling's UMF Remix of "Girl Gone Wild" was released on 20 April 2012, and "Superlove" with Kravitz was released on 29 May 2012. After reaching two million followers on Facebook, Bergling released a new song titled "Two Million". It was put out as a free download on his official SoundCloud page. On 27 April 2012, Bergling released "Silhouettes". The song featured vocals from Salem Al Fakir and peaked at number 5 on the UK Dance charts and number 4 on the Billboard Hot Dance Club Songs.

Bergling was a featured performer on 4 August 2012 at Lollapalooza festival in Chicago's Grant Park. On 12 August 2012, he released "Dancing in My Head" (Avicii's 'Been Cursed' Mix) on Beatport. The track features vocals from Eric Turner. A radio edit of the track, titled "Dancing in My Head" (Tom Hangs Mix) was released on 14 August 2012 on iTunes, and a remix EP was later released on 30 October 2012 featuring remixes from Charlie Bernardo and Michael Woods. On 26 September 2012, Bergling made history as the first DJ to headline the world-famous Radio City Music Hall in New York City. He performed two sold-out shows on 26 and 27 September. He was supported by Matt Goldman and Cazzette at the two shows. At his Radio City Music Hall shows, he played a preview of his new track with Mike Posner titled "Stay with You".

On 29 December 2012, Bergling premiered many new songs at Lights All Night, Dallas Convention Center, some of which made it on to his first album, True. These unreleased songs included "I'll Be Gone" and "Let It Go". The instrumental of "Let It Go" was mixed with the a cappella of "Addicted to You" to become "Addicted to You (Avicii by Avicii)".

On the same day, Bergling released "I Could Be the One" with Nicky Romero. After first being debuted at his shows almost a year earlier, the track finally got released via Bergling's record label Levels. The new vocal version was released along with an instrumental version, a radio edit, and remixes from Audrio and Didrick. On 9 January 2013, Bergling launched the Avicii X You project, a partnership with Ericsson designed to create the world's first "crowdsourced" hit song. The project enabled fans to send in basslines, effects, melodies, rhythms and vocals to Bergling as sound files over the Internet. The song features sequences from Kian Sang (melody), Naxsy (bassline), Martin Kupilas (beat), Vanya Khaksi (break), Jonathan Madray, Mateusz Kolata, and Christian Westphalen (effects). Bergling acted as executive producer and created the finished song officially titled X You, which was released on 26 February 2013. On 30 January 2013, Bergling released "Three Million" featuring Negin to celebrate three million fans on his Facebook page.

Bergling was nominated for a Grammy for Best Dance Recording with "Levels" at the 2013 Grammy Awards. He was nominated alongside Calvin Harris and Ne-Yo, Skrillex, Swedish House Mafia and John Martin, and Al Walser. The award show took place on 10 February 2013. From late February to early March 2013, Bergling toured Australia as one of the headline acts in the Future Music Festival alongside The Prodigy and The Stone Roses. In late February 2013, Bergling made his first South American tour, with concerts in Venezuela, Argentina, Colombia, Brazil and Chile.

2013–2014: True

In March 2013, Bergling announced and premiered new tracks from his forthcoming new album True—which was released in September that year—during his Main Stage set at Ultra Music Festival in Miami. The new tracks were experimental in nature. For example, Bergling brought out a stomping band to play through the new bluegrass-tinged song "Wake Me Up". Many of these new songs received mixed critical reviews after the concert.

On 11 April 2013, Bergling released his new album promo mix on SoundCloud. It contained some songs from True and some of his non-album singles. It also contained some of his IDs such as "Black and Blue" and "Enough is Enough (Don't Give Up On Us)".

The EBU and SVT announced on 15 April that Bergling, along with ex-ABBA members Björn Ulvaeus and Benny Andersson, had composed the anthem for the Eurovision Song Contest 2013. The song was performed for the first time in the Final on 18 May.

On 14 June 2013, the world premiere of Bergling's new single, "Wake Me Up", was previewed by Pete Tong on BBC Radio 1, featuring vocals from Aloe Blacc. The song was later released on iTunes and radio on 25 June 2013. It is the first single from Bergling's album True, which was released on 16 September 2013. "Wake Me Up" was number 1 on the Spotify Global Chart and Bergling was at 2 in most streamed artist worldwide. "Wake Me Up" later went on to set a then record of 14 weeks as the number one hit on Billboards Dance/Electronic Songs list. The Official Charts Company announced on 21 July that "Wake Me Up" had become the UK's fastest selling single of 2013 after overtaking Robin Thicke's "Blurred Lines", having sold 267,000 copies in its first week on sale in the UK. "Wake Me Up" subsequently became a major hit, topping the charts in over 20 countries including Australia, Germany, Ireland, Italy, Sweden, the Netherlands, and New Zealand.

On 19 October 2013, the DJ Mag 2013 Top 100 DJs List was announced, with Bergling ranking number 3 on the list. Hardwell became the new World No.1, displacing Armin Van Buuren. On 28 October 2013, Bergling released the single "Hey Brother" with vocals by Dan Tyminski. On 10 November, Bergling won his first award—"Best Electronic"—at the MTV EMAs. On 24 November 2013 he won the American Music Award for favorite Electronic Dance Music Artist.

In December 2013, Bergling released his fourth single off the album, "Addicted to You", which reached number 5 in Australia, with vocals from Audra Mae, who also sings on "Shame on Me" and "Long Road to Hell", both tracks on the album. Bergling also released the single "Lay Me Down", featuring vocals from Adam Lambert and guitar from Nile Rodgers. On 29 December 2013, Bergling debuted his new track "Dreaming of Me", featuring vocals from Audra Mae, via episode 19 of his LE7ELS podcast. It is unknown whether it will be released in the future.

On 8 March 2014, Bergling's Instagram account confirmed a collaboration with Madonna, and he is credited for co-writing and co-producing some of the tracks on her Rebel Heart album, released in 2015. On 21 March 2014, Bergling released a remixed edition of his album True titled True: Avicii By Avicii containing remixes by himself of all the tracks, excluding "Heart Upon My Sleeve" for unknown reasons. The promotion of this album was supposed to begin at the 2014 Ultra Music Festival, but Bergling announced he had been hospitalised on 28 March, and was unable to play his closing set at the festival. On 28 March 2014, FIFA and Sony Music Entertainment announced that Bergling would be collaborating with Carlos Santana, Wyclef Jean and Alexandre Pires for the official FIFA World Cup Anthem titled "Dar um Jeito (We Will Find a Way)". The anthem was performed at the FIFA World Cup closing ceremony on 13 July 2014.

In July 2014, Bergling released his single "Lay Me Down". He also produced and collaborated with Chris Martin from Coldplay, co-writing and co-producing the track "A Sky Full of Stars" from the band's sixth studio album Ghost Stories, released on 19 May 2014. He also played and recorded the piano parts on the track. "A Sky Full of Stars" was released on 3 May as the second single from Ghost Stories. "Lovers on the Sun", a track Bergling co-produced with David Guetta, was released on 30 June 2014.

2014–2015: Stories

In July 2014, Bergling told Rolling Stone that he had worked on 70 songs for his next album Stories, which would include collaborations with Jon Bon Jovi, Serj Tankian of System of a Down, Chris Martin, Wyclef Jean and Matisyahu. Describing the album, Bergling said that "it's going to be a lot more song-oriented".

During his tour for True, he also performed his upcoming single "No Pleasing a Woman" with vocals from Billie Joe Armstrong of the American rock band Green Day. It has a similar instrumental to "Wake Me Up" albeit different chord progressions, along with "No Pleasing a Woman". Bergling also performed other upcoming songs like "In Love with Your Ghost" with Daniel "Danne" Adams-Ray, "Love to Fall" with Tom Odell and "Million Miles" with LP, which is the demo version of "Trouble", a song from Stories with vocals from Wayne Hector.

"Lose Myself", a collaboration between Bergling and Chinese singer Wang Leehom, was released on 1 September 2014. On 8 September 2014, his 25th birthday, Bergling decided to cancel all of his remaining performances of 2014 due to health concerns. The following day, he announced through Denim & Supply that he would release his new single "The Days" later in 2014; a video was also featured with a preview of the track. "The Days" is a collaboration between Bergling and Robbie Williams, and was released on 3 October 2014 via PRMD. On 16 September 2014, it was announced through EA Sports that Bergling was debuting a new track called "The Nights" exclusively on FIFA 15. On 17 November 2014, it was officially announced that the track is to be released as a part of an EP together with "The Days". On 17 November 2014, Wyclef Jean released a track titled "Divine Sorrow" featuring Avicii, which was part of Product Red's "Share the Sound of an AIDS-Free Generation" campaign.

On 2 March 2015, Bergling performed live at Australia's Future Music Festival his upcoming single "Heaven", with another collaboration with Chris Martin on vocals. The vocals were later resung by singer Simon Aldred from Cherry Ghost, who sang the track at the Avicii Tribute Concert in 2019. However, the version with Martin on vocals was finalized in 2018/2019 after Bergling's death and was released on the posthumous third album Tim, which credits Martin for co-writing "Heaven". On 27 March that year, during his live performance at Ultra Music Festival in Miami, Bergling premiered new tracks from Stories, and a month later he released three full sets on the internet, which included "Heaven", "Waiting for Love", and some of his IDs "For a Better Day", "City Lights", "Can't Catch Me", "True Believer", "What Would I Change It To", "Can't Love You Again" (previously leaked on the internet under the name "Don't Call") and "Attack".

On 25 April 2015, Bergling announced on episode 35 of his LE7ELS podcast that he would be playing some of his unreleased songs on his show. He also previewed his bootleg of Kings of Tomorrow's song "Finally" and one of his old songs that he did with ASH, titled "Papa Was a Rolling Stone".

On 6 May 2015, Bergling released his rework of Nina Simone's version of "Feeling Good", composed in 1964 by the English songwriters Anthony Newley and Leslie Bricusse. On 8 May 2015, Bergling previewed his song "I'll Be Gone" via episode 422 of Tiësto's Club Life podcast, which has a very similar instrumental to "Liar Liar" (Avicii by Avicii) albeit different vocals and chord progressions. It was leaked into the internet between 2013 and 2014 via the name "Stars" and is yet to be released. It also shares a similar drop to one of Bergling's ID's "Black and Blue". On 22 May 2015, Bergling premiered another single from Stories, "Waiting for Love". The track was co-produced by fellow DJ and producer Martin Garrix, and featured vocals from Simon Aldred of Cherry Ghost. On 25 May 2015, Bergling previewed three old tracks on episode 36 of his LE7ELS podcast: "Tracks of My Tears", "Sorry Mr. Atari" and "Time to Get lll", all of which are songs that Bergling had made years ago. "Tracks of My Tears" is the original version of Bergling's "All You Need is Love". On 27 May 2015, it was confirmed by a Swedish newspaper through an interview with Bergling that his second album Stories would be released in late 2015.

On 3 July 2015, Bergling previewed two tracks from his album Stories on episode 37 of his LE7ELS podcast: "Broken Arrows", featuring Zac Brown Band, and "Can't Catch Me", featuring Wyclef Jean and Matisyahu. He also played a full version of his track "Heaven" and said that he was doing another track with Chris Martin on vocals called "True Believer". Later, Bergling said that he is also singing on that track. On 18 July 2015, it was announced by Bergling that he had finally finished production on Stories after 2 years of work.

A couple of weeks later, on 4 August 2015, it was announced that the final singles before the release of Stories would be "For a Better Day", featuring American singer Alex Ebert, and "Pure Grinding", featuring vocals from Kristoffer Fogelmark and Earl St. Clair. On 27 August, Bergling released a teaser video on Instagram with the song "Pure Grinding" playing. The tracks "For a Better Day" and "Pure Grinding" were released the following day through Spotify and iTunes. On 26 September, Bergling announced "Stories – Megamix" on Spotify. Stories was released on 2 October 2015 alongside 3 promotional singles: "Broken Arrows" with Zac Brown, "Ten More Days" with Zak Abel and "Gonna Love Ya" with Sandro Cavazza.

2016: Retirement from touring

On 15 January 2016, Bergling released his remix of Morten's "Beautiful Heartbeat". Coca-Cola had partnered with Bergling for a global campaign anthem, "Taste the Feeling", featuring Conrad Sewell. The song was released on 19 January. On 25 January, Bergling once again teamed up with Coldplay to co-produce the band's single "Hymn for the Weekend", which was released as the second single from their album A Head Full of Dreams. In 2016, according to a report by Inc. magazine, Avicii Music AB was the 6th fastest-growing company in Europe, with a revenue of €7.7 million in 2014.

On 19 March 2016 at Ultra Music Festival, Bergling debuted new demos featuring Sandro Cavazza such as "We Burn (Faster Than Light), "Lord", "Our Love", & "Unbreakable", as well as a collaboration with Australian pop star Sia called "All I Need"; they remain unreleased to this day. On 29 March, Bergling announced via his Facebook page that he would be retiring from performing later that year, citing health concerns. On 7 April 2016, Bergling announced that he was working on a third studio album. On 3 June 2016, Bergling released a collaboration with Otto Knows titled "Back Where I Belong".

On 15 July 2016, Bergling released a remix of his own song, "Feeling Good". The remix was titled "Feeling Good (Avicii by Avicii)". This track was only released on Bergling's official YouTube channel. On 1 August, the track was pulled from YouTube with the video being made private. On 28 August 2016, Bergling performed his final show at Ushuaïa Ibiza Beach Hotel.

On 22 December 2016, a representative of Avicii Music AB announced that Bergling had parted ways with long-time manager Arash Pournouri and At Night Management along with Pournouri's record label PRMD. The representative also announced that Bergling had signed on to Universal Music Sweden and was expected to release his third studio album in 2017.

2017–2018: Avīci (01) and Avicii: True Stories

In June 2017, British singer Rita Ora debuted a semi-acoustic version of "Lonely Together" at a private event at Annabel's in London. "Lonely Together" was later released as the second single from Avīci (01). From 13 July to 2 August, Bergling shared one-minute snippets on Instagram, captioned "New music coming very very (very) soon!", with track titles as hashtags. Bergling uploaded teasers of each track from the EP online upon release.

On 10 August 2017, Bergling released the six-track EP Avīci (01). Bergling said of the release: "I'm really excited to be back with music once again. It has been a long time since I released anything and a long time since I was this excited over new music! My focus on this first EP of the album was to get a mix of new and old songs: some that fans have been asking about and waiting for mixed with brand new songs that they haven't heard before!"

In an interview with Pete Tong on BBC Radio 1, Bergling stated that the EP is one of three parts of his third studio album. On 11 September 2017, Bergling announced a documentary directed by his close and long time collaborator Levan Tsikurishvili, titled Avicii: True Stories. The documentary chronicles the artist's retirement from touring and features interviews from his colleagues David Guetta, Tiësto, Wyclef Jean, Nile Rodgers and Chris Martin of Coldplay.

On 10 February 2018, Bergling released "Ghost", a collaboration with Swedish singer-songwriter Daniel Adams-Ray, who was credited as HUMAN. The song, which was leaked on the internet in 2014/2015 under the title "(I'm Still) In Love with Your Ghost", marks the second collaboration between the two, following "Somewhere in Stockholm" from Bergling's album Stories.

In March 2018, Bergling posted previews of him working with collaborators such as Bonn, Carl Falk, Joe Janiak, Abin Nedler, and more. The songs previewed during these clips ended up being the tracks that were finished and released as part of the posthumous Tim album.

Following Bergling's death that April, news outlets reported that at the time of his death, he had over 200 unreleased songs, some finished and others still in development; it was suggested that his unreleased material comprised some of his best work. In August 2018, producer Carl Falk, who co-produced some of the songs on Stories in 2015 and Avīci (01) in 2017, stated that he was putting the finishing touches on the Chris Martin collaboration "Heaven" (originally written during the Stories sessions) and that it might be posthumously released in a few months along with the third album.

Posthumous release

In April 2019, it was announced that the album Tim, which Bergling was working on before his death, would be released on 6 June 2019, with the first single, "SOS", released on 10 April. All proceeds from the sale of the album went towards the Tim Bergling Foundation. Later that month, it was announced that an official biography of Bergling, written by Måns Mosesson, would be released in 2020, with the proceeds also going to the foundation.

A second single from the album, titled "Tough Love", was released on 9 May 2019. The music video for "Tough Love" was released on 14 May 2019 on YouTube.

"Heaven" was the last single to be released from the album, on 6 June 2019. The track was co-written by Coldplay's lead singer Chris Martin. Martin spoke about the collaboration on his social media, stating that he co-wrote the song with Bergling back in 2014, but it was completed by Bergling in 2016. The music video used old clips of Bergling on vacation in Madagascar after his retirement from touring in 2016 and was released on 24 June 2019. On 28 June, Billboard cited "Heaven" as one of the best dance songs of the first half of 2019. "Fades Away" featuring MishCatt was also released in December after being performed in Stockholm at the Avicii Tribute Concert for Mental Health.

On 24 January 2020, another posthumous single by Avicii was released: "Forever Yours", a collaboration with Kygo and Sandro Cavazza. The song was previously performed by Bergling during his final tour in 2016, starting with Ultra Music Festival. Kygo and Sandro Cavazza performed the song together live at the Avicii Tribute Concert, held in Stockholm's Friends Arena in December 2019. On 15 February, Tiësto premiered three unreleased Avicii singles on the latest episode of his radio show Tiësto's Club Life: a fifth collaboration with Aloe Blacc called "I Wanna Be Free", a fifth collaboration with Sandro Cavazza called "We Burn" and a fifth collaboration with Wyclef Jean called "Now That We Found Love".

On 6 April 2021, it was announced that the biography would be titled Tim – The Official Biography of Avicii and set for release in the UK and North America on 16 November of the same year. Kitty Empire of The Guardian described it as "An honest study of the shy young man turned superstar DJ".

On 23 September 2021, it was announced that a second documentary about Bergling would be released in 2023.

On 12 October 2021, it was announced that a second tribute concert would be held at the Avicii Arena, on 1 December 2021.

Artistry

Influences 

Bergling's influences included Basshunter, Daft Punk, Swedish House Mafia, and Eric Prydz. He described his introduction to electronic music as "listening to a lot of Daft Punk, way before I knew what house music was".

Musical style 
Bergling's early work was deep house and progressive house, usually based on a four-chord structure, sub-bass and a simple synth melody. His debut studio album True featured a blending of music genres, including folktronica. While making the album, Bergling wanted to fuse the electronic music genre with soul, funk, blues, folk and country, as he felt that EDM had become too focused on "dirty drops". Its first single, "Wake Me Up", is a folk music crossover, which, as noted by Katie Bain of The Observer, "tapped into the market potential of mixing EDM and country, a template many artists have since recreated". A Variety editor commented that Bergling's "distinct sound" was made up of "soaring synths and keening melodies". Musicians such as Kygo, Skrillex, Diplo, Gryffin, Martin Garrix and Cheat Codes have cited him as a source of inspiration.

Philanthropy 
After achieving widespread commercial success, Bergling began working with his manager and executive producer Arash Pournouri to start House for Hunger in 2011, a charity dedicated to alleviating global hunger. The pair wanted to showcase the giving spirit fostered by the house music community. Bergling explained, "You have to give something back. I am so fortunate to be in the position where I can actually do that. I feel lucky every day when I wake up and am able to do what I love and make a living." In addition to donating $1 million to Feeding America, a charity founded by John van Hengel, House for Hunger has helped fund the efforts of The Feed Foundation, started by Laura Bush, allowing it to distribute over 2 million school meals throughout Africa. He also supported campaigns against human trafficking and gang violence when he directed the videos for his tracks "For a Better Day" and "Pure Grinding".

Personal life 
Bergling enjoyed playing World of Warcraft in his youth. He developed anxiety at a young age, with his parents taking him to a therapist at the age of 14.

Relationships 
From 2011 to 2013, Bergling dated Emily Goldberg, an American student. He then dated Racquel Bettencourt, a Canadian student and model; they lived together in California before splitting up in late 2014. At the time of his death, he was dating Tereza Kacerova, a model; they had decided to keep their relationship private.

Health 
In January 2012, Bergling was hospitalised for 11 days in New York City with acute pancreatitis caused by excessive alcohol use. In 2014, Bergling underwent surgery and had both his appendix and gallbladder removed. In 2016, Bergling's health deteriorated, and he retired from performing live. Between 2012 and 2014, Bergling was prescribed opioids for the pain caused by his pancreatitis, including OxyContin and Vicodin, to which he developed an addiction. In the 2017 documentary Avicii: True Stories, directed by his close and longtime collaborator Levan Tsikurishvili, Bergling spoke about his physical and mental health struggles. The documentary depicts the pressure from his management to continue performing live in spite of his objections.

Following his retirement, Bergling took up transcendental meditation, which he credited with reducing his anxiety, and started seeing a therapist.

High pressure from management and fans to continue touring and maintaining his public persona were cited as key reasons for his suicide, according to GQ. In a statement from the article, "Bergling feared upsetting fans. He was sensitive to the 'flood of hate mail' after cancelled gigs."

His manager, Arash Pournouri, admitted that he knew of Bergling's anxieties but refused to label them a problem of mental health. Furthermore, his management team only became aware of his painkiller addiction in November 2014. They staged two interventions for him, neither of which were successful. Pournouri rescheduled many shows in order for Bergling to recover in Stockholm. Having discovered his client's alcohol issues earlier, Pournouri set out to forbid his promoters from offering him alcohol, clearing out his minibar and focusing on his recovery. Problems worsened, however, when there were no crew to "keep tabs" on Bergling during his recuperation. Pournouri met with Bergling's father Klas in 2014 to share concerns about Bergling's health.

Against his client's wishes, Pournouri claimed to have cancelled two more world tours, which would have added up to approximately US$2.9 million in profits.

Death 

Bergling died on 20 April 2018 in Muscat, where he was on holiday, at the age of 28. No cause of death was immediately given. On 21 April, the Omani police stated that there was "no criminal suspicion" or evidence of foul play in Bergling's death. A day before Bergling's death, a friend expressed concern about his mental state to his father Klas. TMZ later reported that he committed suicide using a glass shard to cut himself. On 26 April, his family released an open letter stating:

On 22 May, Bergling's family announced plans for a private funeral with "the people who were closest to him". A funeral service was held on 8 June at the cemetery Skogskyrkogården in Stockholm. He was buried at Hedvig Eleonora Church in June 2018.

Tributes

From fellow musicians
On 22 April 2018, American band OneRepublic paid tribute to Bergling by performing his hit single "Wake Me Up" during their show in Mumbai.

On 20 May 2018, American DJ duo The Chainsmokers and American singer-songwriter Halsey paid tribute to Bergling at the 2018 Billboard Music Awards before presenting the winner of the Top Hot 100 Song. The Chainsmokers' Drew Taggart said, "His passing was a great loss for the music world and for us. He was an artist who inspired so many in so many ways, and simply put, he meant so much to us and everyone in the EDM community." Halsey then delivered an emotional discussion about mental health and emphasized the need for people to love and support each other.

On 21 May 2018, Tiësto played a medley of Bergling's songs at EDC Las Vegas. Aloe Blacc joined him on stage to perform "Wake Me Up".

On 27 May, at BBC Radio 1's Big Weekend, Rita Ora, Bergling's most recent collaborator, paid tribute to the late DJ, describing him as "a really good friend" who "changed [her] life". A similar tribute was also paid by Ora during King's Day and Capital's Summertime Ball.

The 2018 edition of Tomorrowland saw several tributes to Bergling from Axwell Λ Ingrosso, Don Diablo, Nicky Romero, Dimitri Vegas & Like Mike, Zedd and Kygo, the latter mentioning that Bergling was his biggest influence in EDM. All DJs honoured his memory by playing his music in their sets during the festival which Michael Thivaios (Like Mike) described as Bergling's home. Thivaios continued calling Bergling "one of [his] best friends" and "a great inspiration". Avicii's songs "Levels" and "Wake Me Up" came second and eighth respectively in Tomorrowland 2018's most played songs.

On 27 July, Russian DJ and producer Arty released a song called "Tim" as a tribute to Bergling. "I made a track for my friend", he stated. "I just want to honor his memory. I want to do something right, and in my opinion it's the right thing to do."

During the 2018 version of Creamfields, Kaleidoscope Orchestra performed a special tribute performance, where they played out Bergling's greatest dance hits.

On 12 October, Vicetone released a song called "South Beach", which they stated was influenced by Bergling's music and was one of the first songs they created, and that they decided to finish and release it as a tribute.

In addition to the live tributes, many other artists—including Eric Prydz, Imagine Dragons, Skrillex, Calvin Harris, Hardwell, Deadmau5, Marshmello, Zedd, and Robbie Williams—also paid tribute to Bergling on Twitter.

One year after his death, tributes on social media continued to be paid by Nicky Romero, DJ Snake, Nile Rodgers, and the organisers of Tomorrowland, amongst others. In 2021, Basshunter recorded the song "Life Speaks to Me" as a tribute to Avicii.

Other tributes

On 21 April 2018, a collection of Avicii's songs were played on the carillon within Dom Tower of Utrecht, performed by Malgosia Fiebig.

On 21 May 2018, during the first night of the finale of the fourteenth season of reality television singing competition show The Voice, coach Alicia Keys performed Avicii's "Wake Me Up" as part of her coach duet with the last remaining artist on her team, Britton Buchanan. During the performance, Keys made a verbal tribute to Avicii.

On 16 November 2018, Bergling's family organised a public memorial service at the Hedvig Eleonora Church in Stockholm. The service saw a huge turn-out, with hundreds of fans filling the church to mourn and pay their respects. The service featured an orchestral choir which played music linking to events in Bergling's life and ended with a version of his 2013 number one hit "Wake Me Up". One fan described it as a "very moving" service and "a great tribute to Bergling".

On 30 April 2019, the Mounted Royal Guards and the Life Guards' Dragoon Music Corps of the Swedish Army paid tribute to Avicii during a ceremony at Stockholm Palace, where brass renditions of his songs "Without You", "Hey Brother", and "Wake Me Up" were played.

The 2019 edition of the music festival Tomorrowland included a tribute in the decoration of the Main stage of the festival.

In September 2019, it was announced that a tribute concert would be held in Stockholm on 5 December 2019 in memory of Avicii. The concert saw David Guetta, Kygo, Dimitri Vegas & Like Mike, Nicky Romero, and Laidback Luke headlining, along with a number of vocalists that Tim had worked with playing alongside a 30-piece orchestra, fulfilling one of Avicii's dreams for his music in a live setting. All profits went to the Tim Bergling Foundation. Following the start of ticket sales, the concert sold out in 30 minutes.

In October of the same year, Avicii was honoured with a waxwork statue at the Madame Tussauds museum in New York City.

In the same month, it was announced that the video game AVICII Invector would be released. Gameplay includes single and multiplayer versions where players would use the game to recreate 25 of his hits throughout the years. A portion of the profits are set to be donated to the Tim Bergling Foundation. Rebecca May of The Guardian rated the game 4/5 stars, describing it as "an immersive musical tribute".

On 19 May 2021, Stockholm's Ericsson Globe was renamed the Avicii Arena. To commemorate the new name, the Royal Stockholm Philharmonic Orchestra recorded a performance of the Avicii song "For a Better Day", with vocals provided by 14-year-old Swedish singer Ella Tiritiello.

On 8 September 2021, Google Doodle celebrated what would have been Bergling's 32nd birthday with an animated video featuring "Wake Me Up", in support of National Suicide Prevention Week.

Impact and legacy

Mental health awareness

On 26 March 2019, Bergling's family launched a mental illness and suicide prevention foundation, named after the late DJ, the Tim Bergling Foundation. The foundation works internationally and aims to educate people and businesses on the issues surrounding suicide and mental health. The foundation also works to tackle climate change, manage business development, and conserve endangered species. Since 2019 people in the music industry are claiming Avicii's death has raised awareness of mental health in the industry.

Music innovation
Avicii inspired many artists in the EDM genre, many of whom paid tribute to him after his death. Norwegian DJ Kygo cited Avicii as "[his] biggest inspiration and the reason why [he] started making electronic music." In addition, artists like Alan Walker and DubVision described him as an "icon" in EDM. Other artists such as Diplo, Sebastian Ingrosso, Felix Jaehn, and Martin Garrix, the last of whom collaborated with Avicii on his 2015 single "Waiting for Love", have also cited him as a source of inspiration, with the songs "Levels" and "Seek Bromance" being specifically mentioned as points of inspiration.

On the day of his death, The Washington Post wrote an article citing Avicii as a pioneer artist in the attempt to bridge the gap between country and electronic music, crediting his 2013 hits "Wake Me Up" and "Hey Brother" as good examples of this movement. Avicii is also credited for influencing other attempts at continuing this genre crossover, including songs such as Zedd's "The Middle" and Hailee Steinfeld's "Let Me Go".

Avicii also influenced a number of mainstream artists outside electronic music. Nile Rodgers said that in terms of melody writing, Avicii was "maybe one of the best, if not the best I've ever worked with." Mike Einziger of Incubus said "Some of the work we did together is some of the music I'm most proud of in my whole life." Dan Reynolds of Imagine Dragons said "working with [Avicii] was one of my favorite collaborative moments." Charlie Puth said that Avicii was "The man who really opened my eyes as to what my productions could one day sound like." Eric Clapton, who never publicly worked with Avicii, said he was "Inspired by Avicii", and dedicated a song off his Christmas album, Happy Xmas, to him.

On 21 November 2019, Billboard named Avicii's 2011 hit "Levels" as one of the one hundred songs which defined the 2010s, whereas his 2013 hit "Wake Me Up" came 13th (and was the highest-charting EDM song) on the Official Charts Company's chart of the decade.

Museum 

On 9 June 2020, it was announced that an Avicii Tribute Museum would open in Stockholm in the summer of 2021. The renamed Avicii Experience was opened in February 2022 by Prince Carl Phillip and Princess Sofia, alongside Bergling's father Klas, in Space Stockholm, a new digital culture centre near Sergels torg. The museum features reconstructions of Bergling's childhood bedroom and Los Angeles mansion, as well as offering recordings of Avicii's most popular work and unreleased music.

The museum was the idea of Bergling's parents, who wanted to give fans a place to remember and celebrate the work of their late son and learn about his process for creating music. The interactive museum also includes exhibitions from various stages in Bergling's life, including a simulation of the high paced lifestyle he experienced before his retirement from touring in 2016, which are designed to give visitors an understanding of the health issues faced by the star. Exhibitions are also dedicated to raising the awareness of mental health problems in young people and the wider music industry.

Filmography

Discography

Studio albums
 True (2013)
 Stories (2015)
 Tim (2019)

Concert tours
 House for Hunger (2012)
 True Tour (2014)
 Stories World Tour (2015)

Awards and nominations

In popular culture
 Avicii was depicted on a Swedish postage stamp issued 15 January 2015 by PostNord Sverige.
 Avicii was named in the 2015 song "I Took a Pill in Ibiza" by American singer and songwriter Mike Posner. Posner recounts the event when he went to an Avicii show in Ibiza and got a mystery pill from someone, with the starting lyrics "I took a pill in Ibiza / To show Avicii I was cool". The song was made in the week they wrote a song together in Sweden called "Stay with You".
 Avicii was the codename of the OnePlus Nord, a smartphone released in 2020.
 On 8 September 2021, Google released a doodle to pay homage to Bergling on what would have been his 32nd birthday during National Suicide Prevention Week.

See also
 Popular music in Sweden
 Tim Bergling Foundation

References

External links 

 
 Avicii Experience—interactive museum
 
 

 
1989 births
2018 deaths
2018 suicides
21st-century Swedish male musicians
21st-century Swedish musicians
Buddhism in music
Burials at Skogskyrkogården
Deaths in Oman
DJs from Stockholm
Electro house musicians
Electronic dance music DJs
FL Studio users
Geffen Records artists
MTV Europe Music Award winners
Musicians from Stockholm
Progressive house musicians
Remixers
Suicides in Oman
Swedish composers
Swedish dance musicians
Swedish DJs
Swedish electronic musicians
Swedish house musicians
Swedish philanthropists
Swedish record producers
Swedish songwriters
Ultra Records artists